is a Japanese conductor.

Born in Tokyo, Hirokami studied conducting, piano, musicology, and viola at the Tokyo College of Music.  He won the first Kondrashin International Conducting Competition in Amsterdam in September 1984 at age 26. One of the judges of that competition, pianist Vladimir Ashkenazy, then engaged Hirokami to conduct the NHK Symphony Orchestra on a tour of Japan with Ashkenazy in May 1985.

From 1991-1996, he was Chief Conductor of the Norrköping Symphony Orchestra. He served as Chief Conductor of the Limburg Symphony Orchestra from 1998 to 2000. He has also been the Principal Guest Conductor of both the Japan Philharmonic Orchestra and the Royal Liverpool Philharmonic Orchestra.

Hirokami became the Music Director of the Columbus Symphony Orchestra on June 1, 2006, with an initial contract for 3 years.  During the orchestra's 2008 financial crisis, Hirokami strongly supported the musicians during a protracted contract dispute, which caused strained relations between Hirokami and the orchestra's board and management.  On November 13, 2008, in a letter to the orchestra's musicians, Hirokami announced that the board of the Columbus Symphony Orchestra had dismissed him from his post, effective immediately.  Since April 2008, he has served as Chief Conductor of the Kyoto Symphony Orchestra, with an initial contract of 3 years.

Hirokami and his wife Yukari have a daughter, Kimiko. In 1973, pop singer Junko Sakurada's music inspired then 15-year-old Hirokami so that he started a fan club dedicated to her.

References

External links
 Kyoto Symphony Orchestra English-language page on Hirokami
 Hazard Chase (agency), "Junichi Hirokami appointed chief conductor of the Kyoto Symphony Orchestra".  September 2007.
 Los Angeles Philharmonic biography of Hirokami, April 2000
 Limburg Symphony Orchestra Dutch-language page on orchestra history

1958 births
20th-century conductors (music)
21st-century conductors (music)
Hirokami, Junichi
Hirokami, Junichi
Living people
Tokyo College of Music alumni
Academic staff of Tokyo the College of Music